Martin Goodman Cohn (May 5, 1893 – November 19, 1953) was an American film editor and film producer who worked on B-movie genre pictures in Hollywood from the 1910s through the 1940s.

Biography 
Cohn was born in New York City to Goodman Cohn and Jennie Nathan. His parents were Jewish immigrants. He married Anna Messing in Brooklyn in 1916. He began working as a film editor in the early 1910s, although like most editors of that era, he was not credited onscreen for his efforts. Eventually the family moved from New York City to Los Angeles, where he continued his career.

He was a founding member of the Society of Motion Picture Film Editors (a precursor to the Motion Picture Editors Guild) in 1937; early on, he served as treasurer. In the 1930s, he began working as a producer on projects, although editing seems to have continued to be his primary focus. During this time, he was credited with pioneering the "change-over," a technique that allowed projectionists to keep a film running without stopping to change reels.

He died in 1953 in Hollywood, where he had lived for 28 years. He was survived by his wife, Anna, and his son, Quinn Martin (who later became a famous TV producer). His brother Elias worked in Hollywood as a cameraman.

Selected filmography 

 Oriental Evil (1951)
 Tokyo File 212 (1951)
 The Girl from San Lorenzo (1950)
 Satan's Cradle (1949)
 Zamba (1949)
 The Daring Caballero (1949)
 The Gay Amigo (1949)
 Deadline (1948)
 The Valiant Hombre (1948)
 The Strange Mrs. Crane (1948)
 Lady at Midnight (1948)
 The Counterfeiters (1948)
 Heading for Heaven (1947)
 Killer Dill (1947)
 God's Country (1946)
 Sensation Hunters (1945)
 In Old New Mexico (1945)
 The Cisco Kid Returns (1945)
 Song of the Range (1944) 
 Shadow of Suspicion (1944)
 When Strangers Marry (1944) 
 Johnny Doesn't Live Here Anymore (1944) 
 Charlie Chan in the Secret Service (1944) 
 The Sultan's Daughter (1943)  
 The Unknown Guest (1943)  
 A Gentle Gangster (1943)  
 Girls' Town (1942)
 Borrowed Hero (1941)
 I Killed That Man (1941)
 The Deadly Game (1941)
 Murder by Invitation (1941)
 Paper Bullets (1941)
 Yukon Flight (1940)
 The Terror of Tiny Town (1938) 
 Sunset Murder Case (1938) 
 Mis dos amores (1938) 
 Castillos en el aire (1938) 
 Sing While You're Able (1937)
 Born to Fight (1936)
 Robin Hood, Jr. (1936)
 With Love and Kisses (1936) 
 Headline Crasher (1936)
 Wild Horse Round-Up (1936)
 Last of the Pagans (1935)
 Morals for Women (1931) 
 Arizona Terror (1931) 
 Left Over Ladies (1931)
 Alias the Bad Man (1931) 
 The Lost Zeppelin (1929)
 Unmasked (1929)
 Stormy Waters (1928) 
 The Scarlet Dove (1928)  
 Nameless Men (1928)  
 Streets of Shanghai (1927) 
 Wild Geese (1927) 
 Once and Forever (1927) 
 The Girl from Gay Paree (1927) 
 The Cat and the Canary (1927) 
 Mothers of Men (1917)
 The World and the Woman'' (1916)

References

External links 

 

American film editors
1893 births
1953 deaths